Tornos abjectarius is a species of geometrid moth in the family Geometridae. It is found in North America.

The MONA or Hodges number for Tornos abjectarius is 6487.

Subspecies
These four subspecies belong to the species Tornos abjectarius:
 Tornos abjectarius abjectarius
 Tornos abjectarius calcasiata Cassino & Swett, 1923
 Tornos abjectarius kimballi Rindge, 1954
 Tornos abjectarius ravus Rindge, 1954

References

Further reading

 
 

Boarmiini
Articles created by Qbugbot
Moths described in 1887